A quantitative PCR instrument is a machine that amplifies and detects DNA. It combines the functions of a thermal cycler and a fluorimeter, enabling the process of quantitative PCR.

The first quantitative PCR machine was described in 1993, and two commercial models became available in 1996. By 2009, eighteen different models were offered by seven different manufacturers. Prices range from about 4,300 USD to 150,000 USD

Principal performance dimensions of quantitative PCR instruments are thermal control, fluorimetry and sample throughput.

Thermal control
Efficient performance of quantitative PCR requires rapid, precise, thermal control.

30 cycles of PCR have been demonstrated in less than 10 minutes. Rapid cycling provides several benefits, including, reduced time to result, increased system throughput and improved reaction specificity. In practice however, engineering trade-offs between ease of use, temperature uniformity, and speed, mean that reaction times are typically more than 25 minutes.

Thermal non-uniformity during temperature cycling contributes to variability in PCR and, unfortunately, some thermocyclers do not meet the specifications claimed by manufacturers. Increasing the speed of thermal cycling generally reduces thermal uniformity, and can reduce the precision of quantitative PCR.

The temperature uniformity also has a direct effect on the ability to discriminate different PCR products by performing melting point analysis. In addition to uniformity, the resolution with which instruments are able to control temperature is a factor which affects their performance when performing high resolution melting analyses.

Therefore, speed, precision and uniformity of thermal control are important performance characteristics of quantitative PCR instruments.

Fluorimetry
Quantitative PCR instruments monitor the progress of PCR, and the nature of amplified products, by measuring fluorescence.

The range of different fluorescent labels that can be monitored, the precision with which they can be measured, and the ability to discriminate signals from different labels, are relevant performance characteristics.

By using an instrument with sufficient optical channels and extensive assay optimisation, up to 7 separate targets can be simultaneously quantified in a single PCR reaction. However, even with extensive optimisation, the effective dynamic range of such multiplex assays is often reduced due to interference between the constituent reactions.

The noise in fluorescence measurements affects the precision of qPCR. It is typically a function of excitation source intensity variation, detector noise and mechanical noise. Multi factorial analysis has suggested that the contribution of mechanical noise is the most important factor, and that systems with no moving parts in their optical paths are likely to provide improved quantitative precision.

In addition, when performing high resolution melting analyses, one factor that affects the sensitivity of heteroduplex detection is fluorimetric precision.

Therefore, the number of optical channels and the level of noise in fluorescence measurements are also important performance characteristics of quantitative PCR instruments.

References

External links
 Available real-time PCR cyclers
 Features of Real-time PCR Platforms and qPCR Machines

Laboratory equipment